Prakashdada Solanke (b 1955) is an Indian politician who served as minister of state for revenue, rehabilitation in Maharashtra government. He is four times MLA from  Majalgaon assembly constituency. His father, Sundarrao Solanke, was a former Deputy Chief Minister of Maharashtra and veteran Congress leader.

Education
He studied higher secondary in Modern college, Pune. Then graduated from Fergusson college, Pune. He completed his masters in Economics from Mumbai university.

Positions held
 Deputy Chairman,  Panchayat Samiti, Majalgaon.
 Member of Legislative Assembly Majalgaon - Four times
 Chairman, Majalgaon Sahakari Sakhar Karkhana, Telgaon
 President, Marathwada Shikshan Prasarak Mandal, Aurangabad
 Vice-President, Nationalist Congress Party, Maharashtra region.

References

1955 births
Living people
Fergusson College alumni
Maharashtra MLAs 2009–2014
University of Mumbai alumni
Bharatiya Janata Party politicians from Maharashtra
Nationalist Congress Party politicians